Ken Hinkley (born 30 September 1966) is the senior coach of the Port Adelaide Football Club in the Australian Football League (AFL) and a former player with the Geelong Football Club and Fitzroy Football Club.

Early life 
Hinkley was born in Cobden, Victoria. He spent his youth in Camperdown as the 7th of 10 children. As a teenager Hinkley played for the Camperdown Football Club.

Playing career

Fitzroy (1987–1988) 
In 1987 Hinkley made his VFL debut as a forward for Fitzroy in a match against North Melbourne at Waverley Park. Hinkley did not enjoy his time in Melbourne and was approached by Geelong at the end of the 1988 VFL season.

Geelong (1989–1995) 
Hinkley moved to Geelong for the 1989 VFL season and it was at his second club where he played his best football as a rebounding defender. Hinkley walked out of Fitzroy in 1988 and asked for a clearance to Geelong. He stood out of football for the rest of 1988 season before being traded to Geelong for the 1989 season. A half back flanker in the 1991 and 1992 All-Australian teams, Hinkley also won a Carji Greeves Medal as Geelong's best and fairest player in the 1992 AFL season. In the same year he finished third at the Brownlow Medal count, behind winner Scott Wynd and Hawthorn's Jason Dunstall. He appeared in 12 finals with Geelong, including the 1992, 1994 and 1995 Grand Final losses.

Coaching career

Hampden senior coach (1996–1998) 
Retiring after the 1995 AFL Grand Final, Hinkley joined Hampden Football League club Mortlake as coach, where he remained for three seasons.

Camperdown senior coach (1999–2000) 
Hinkley returned to Camperdown and coached the club to back-to-back premierships in 1999 and 2000, the former as captain-coach.

St Kilda Football club assistant coach (2001)
St Kilda acquired his services as an assistant coach in 2001 under senior coaches Malcolm Blight and Grant Thomas, but he left the club after one season.

Bell Park senior coach (2002–2003) 
The year after leaving St Kilda he took up the role of senior coach of Bell Park in the Geelong Football League and oversaw a premiership in 2003.

Geelong Football Club assistant coach (2004–2009) 
He resumed his AFL coaching career in 2004, as an assistant coach under senior coach Mark Thompson at Geelong, and was part of the coaching group in their 2007 and 2009 AFL premierships. Hinkley left Geelong at the end of the 2009 season.

Gold Coast Suns assistant coach (2011–2012) 
At the end of the 2009 season, Hinkley was announced as an assistant coach at the new Gold Coast Football Club under senior coach Guy McKenna. Hinkley served as assistant coach for the Suns in their inaugural season in the 2011 season and the 2012 season. during this period, Hinkley  also interviewed for the Richmond, Geelong and St Kilda senior coach positions but was unsuccessful.

Port Adelaide Football Club senior coach (2013–present)

On 8 October 2012, Hinkley was announced as the senior coach of Port Adelaide making him the first coach that has not been associated with the club before since Fos Williams. Hinkley replaced Port Adelaide caretaker senior coach Garry Hocking, who replaced Matthew Primus, after Primus was sacked during the 2012 season. In his debut season, Hinkley led Port to 13 wins, which included an elimination final win at the MCG against Collingwood before being eliminated by Geelong in a close game a week later. This came to a surprise to many as Port Adelaide had only won eight games in the previous two seasons combined. For his impressive season, Hinkley was voted as the Coach of the Year by the AFL Coaches Association.

The Power disappointingly missed finals in 2015 and 2016 before returning in 2017, only to be eliminated in the first week in an intense Elimination Final against the West Coast Eagles which went all the way down to a kick after the siren in extra-time. Hinkley's contract with Port Adelaide was extended in late 2017.

After guiding Port Adelaide to minor premiership and a Preliminary Final appearance during the 2020 AFL season, Hinkley signed a contract extension until the end of 2023. 2021 saw another Preliminary Final appearance for the Power, while in 2022 the team slipped out of the top eight, placing pressure on Hinkley for his final contracted season in 2023.

Personal life
Hinkley is a cousin of Geelong player Gary Rohan.

Statistics

Playing statistics

|-
|- style="background-color: #EAEAEA"
! scope="row" style="text-align:center" | 1987
|style="text-align:center;"|
| 48 || 10 || 20 || 12 || 79 || 33 || 112 || 39 || 8 || 2.0 || 1.2 || 7.9 || 3.3 || 11.2 || 3.9 || 0.8
|-
! scope="row" style="text-align:center" | 1988
|style="text-align:center;"|
| 22 || 1 || 1 || 3 || 15 || 3 || 18 || 4 || 0 || 1.0 || 3.0 || 15.0 || 3.0 || 18.0 || 4.0 || 0.0
|- style="background-color: #EAEAEA"
! scope="row" style="text-align:center" | 1989
|style="text-align:center;"|
| 39 || 1 || 0 || 0 || 6 || 2 || 8 || 0 || 1 || 0.0 || 0.0 || 6.0 || 2.0 || 8.0 || 0.0 || 1.0
|-
! scope="row" style="text-align:center" | 1990
|style="text-align:center;"|
| 39 || 15 || 27 || 25 || 149 || 64 || 213 || 64 || 10 || 1.8 || 1.7 || 9.9 || 4.3 || 14.2 || 4.3 || 0.7
|- style="background-color: #EAEAEA"
! scope="row" style="text-align:center" | 1991
|style="text-align:center;"|
| 29 || 24 || 3 || 10 || 391 || 110 || 501 || 114 || 26 || 0.1 || 0.4 || 16.3 || 4.6 || 20.9 || 4.8 || 1.1
|-
! scope="row" style="text-align:center" | 1992
|style="text-align:center;"|
| 29 || 26 || 8 || 7 || 443 || 100 || 543 || 130 || 32 || 0.3 || 0.3 || 17.0 || 3.8 || 20.9 || 5.0 || 1.2
|- style="background-color: #EAEAEA"
! scope="row" style="text-align:center" | 1993
|style="text-align:center;"|
| 29 || 16 || 5 || 7 || 211 || 89 || 300 || 56 || 12 || 0.3 || 0.4 || 13.2 || 5.6 || 18.8 || 3.5 || 0.8
|-
! scope="row" style="text-align:center" | 1994
|style="text-align:center;"|
| 29 || 25 || 2 || 4 || 306 || 130 || 436 || 95 || 26 || 0.1 || 0.2 || 12.2 || 5.2 || 17.4 || 3.8 || 1.0
|- style="background-color: #EAEAEA"
! scope="row" style="text-align:center" | 1995
|style="text-align:center;"|
| 29 || 14 || 13 || 14 || 137 || 59 || 196 || 37 || 8 || 0.9 || 1.0 || 9.8 || 4.2 || 14.0 || 2.6 || 0.6
|- class="sortbottom"
! colspan=3| Career
! 132
! 79
! 82
! 1737
! 590
! 2327
! 539
! 123
! 0.6
! 0.6
! 13.2
! 4.5
! 17.6
! 4.1
! 0.9
|}

Coaching statistics
Statistics are correct to Round 18, 2020

|- style="background-color: #EAEAEA"
! scope="row" style="font-weight:normal"|2013*
|
| 23 || 13 || 10 || 0 || 56.5% || 5 || 18
|-
! scope="row" style="font-weight:normal"|2014
|
| 25 || 16 || 9 || 0 || 64.0% || 3 || 18
|- style="background-color: #EAEAEA"
! scope="row" style="font-weight:normal"|2015
| || 22 || 12 || 10 || 0 || 54.6% || 9 || 18
|-
! scope="row" style="font-weight:normal"|2016
|
| 22 || 10 || 12 || 0 || 45.5% || 10 || 18
|- style="background-color: #EAEAEA"
! scope="row" style="font-weight:normal"|2017
|
| 23 || 14 || 9 || 0 || 60.9% || 7|| 18
|- style="background-color: #EAEAEA"
! scope="row" style="font-weight:normal"|2018
|
| 22 || 12 || 10 || 0 || 54.5% || 10|| 18
|- style="background-color: #EAEAEA"
! scope="row" style="font-weight:normal"|2019
|
| 22 || 11 || 11 || 0 || 50.0% || 10|| 18
|- style="background-color: #EAEAEA"
! scope="row" style="font-weight:normal"|2020
|
| 17|| 14 || 3 || 0 || 82.4% || 1 || 18
|- class="sortbottom"
|- class="sortbottom"
!colspan=2| Career totals
!176
!102
!74
!0
!58.0%
! colspan=2|
|}
*Hinkley did not coach the round 6, 2013 match due to an illness.

References

External links

1966 births
Living people
Geelong Football Club players
Fitzroy Football Club players
Carji Greeves Medal winners
All-Australians (AFL)
Australian rules footballers from Victoria (Australia)
Port Adelaide Football Club coaches
Mortlake Football Club players
Mortlake Football Club coaches
Camperdown Football Club players
Camperdown Football Club coaches
Victorian State of Origin players